Anomalon is a large genus of parasitoid wasps belonging to the family Ichneumonidae. This may be the only genus in the tribe Anomalonini, although Neogreeneia Viereck, 1912 is sometimes considered a valid genus of the tribe.

These wasps are present worldwide, but most diverse in tropical regions. Twenty species are recorded from Costa Rica. In the Africa and the Middle East, they are well represented in dry habitats, but in the Americas are most common in very wet rain forests. Recorded hosts include tenebrionid or elaterid beetle larvae and noctuid and tortricid moth larvae.

Description
"The species of Anomalon can easily be recognized from other Anomaloninae by the combination of the following morphological features: 
 notaulus indistinct, represented by a rugose area; 
 fore wing with r-m joining 2/M distal to 2m-cu; 
 hind wing with distal abscissa of 2/Cu entirely absent; 
 epipleurum of third metasomal tergite separated by a crease just below the spiracle; 
 mid tibia with a single apical spur."

Selected species
Species within this genus include:

 Anomalon arcuatum Dasch, 1984
 Anomalon arizonicum Dasch, 1984
 Anomalon canadense (Cresson, 1879)
 Anomalon constrictum Dasch, 1984
 Anomalon coreanum (Uchida, 1928)
 Anomalon cruentatum (Geoffroy, 1785)
 Anomalon curvatum Dasch, 1984
 Anomalon ejuncidum Say, 1836
 Anomalon exrufum Walkley, 1958
 Anomalon floridanum Dasch, 1984
 Anomalon fuscipenne (Tosquinet, 1900)
 Anomalon glabrumm Dasch, 1984
 Anomalon japonicum (Uchida, 1928)
 Anomalon kozlovi (Kokujev, 1915)
 Anomalon kurumensis Kusigemati, 1983
 Anomalon kusigematii Momoi, 1968
 Anomalon laterale Brulle, 1846
 Anomalon montanum Dasch, 1984
 Anomalon nigribase Cushman, 1937
 Anomalon nigritum Norton, 1863
 Anomalon ocellatum Dasch, 1984
 Anomalon picticornis (Viereck, 1912)
 Anomalon reticulatum Cresson, 1865
 Anomalon victorovi Momoi, 1968
 Anomalon vivum Cresson, 1879
 Anomalon yoshiyasui Kusigemati, 1985

References

Ichneumonidae genera